Archibald Glen (16 April 1929 – 30 August 1998) was a Scottish footballer who played as a left half for Aberdeen, where he spent his whole professional career. He made 270 appearances for the club in the three major domestic competitions, and helped Aberdeen win the 1954–55 league championship and the 1955 Scottish League Cup Final.

Glen also represented the Scotland national football team twice in the 1956 British Home Championship, and represented the Scottish League XI seven times between 1954 and 1958.

Career statistics

Club

International

See also 
List of one-club men in association football

References

External links 

1929 births
1998 deaths
Footballers from South Lanarkshire
People educated at Cumnock Academy
Association football wing halves
Scottish footballers
Scotland international footballers
Alumni of the University of Aberdeen
Scottish Football League players
Scottish Junior Football Association players
Annbank United F.C. players
Aberdeen F.C. players
Scottish Football League representative players
Scotland B international footballers